Collin Mitchell (born September 23, 1969 in Freeport, Bahamas) is a Canadian curler and coach from Brooklin, Ontario. He is an Olympic silver medallist. He received a silver medal with the Mike Harris curling team at the 1998 Winter Olympics in Nagano. At the time of the 1998 Olympics, he was a resident of Pickering, Ontario.

Personal life
Mitchell is president of W. Mitchell & Son Mechanical Ltd. He is married and has three children.

References

External links
 

1969 births
Living people
Olympic curlers of Canada
Curlers at the 1998 Winter Olympics
Olympic silver medalists for Canada
Curlers from Ontario
People from Pickering, Ontario
Sportspeople from Whitby, Ontario
People from Freeport, Bahamas
Bahamian emigrants to Canada
Olympic medalists in curling
Medalists at the 1998 Winter Olympics
Canadian male curlers
Canada Cup (curling) participants
Canadian curling coaches